Anne-Chatrine Lafrenz (born 30 September 1936) is a German athlete. She competed in the women's shot put and the women's discus throw at the 1956 Summer Olympics.

References

1936 births
Living people
Athletes (track and field) at the 1956 Summer Olympics
German female shot putters
German female discus throwers
Olympic athletes of the United Team of Germany
Place of birth missing (living people)